Survivor 1, was the first edition of the Greek version of the popular reality show Survivor and it aired from September 2003 to December 2003. This season being the inaugural season of Survivor in Greece did not involve many twists; however, there were a few notable twists that did occur. The first of these twists occurred in the second episode cycle in which North team member Elias Valasis and South team member Nikos Lamprinakis swapped tribes. In this same episode cycle, Eugenia Katsarou entered the game and joined the South team following their win at the second reward challenge. All three of the contestants previously mentioned had immunity at their tribes first tribal council after the second immunity challenge. When the merge came, the two teams initially stuck with their former tribe members and voted against their former opponents; however, as time went on alliances were made within teams. The most powerful of these alliances was that of the trio Evagelina Dermetzoglou, Nikos Lamprinakis, and Orthoula Papdaki, who controlled the later stages of the game and ultimately made up the final three. When it came time for the final three they competed in two challenges in order to decide who would be in the final two. Eventually, it was Evagelina Dermetzoglou who won the season over Nikos Lamprinakis with a jury vote of 8-0.

Finishing order

Voting history

 At the second tribal council, both Elias and Eugenia had immunity.

 This was an open vote because Thodoris decided to leave.

 At the seventh tribal council, both Despina and Efimia received five votes. Because of this the two were forced to compete in a duel which Despina won.

External links
 (Season 1 Official Site Archive) 

01
2003 Greek television seasons
Television shows filmed in Malaysia